Har Govind Singh was an Indian politician. He was elected to the Lok Sabha, the lower house of the Parliament of India, as a member of the Janata Dal.

References

External links
Official biographical sketch in Lok Sabha website

India MPs 1989–1991
Lok Sabha members from Uttar Pradesh
1935 births
Janata Dal politicians